Bure Park is a   Local Nature Reserve in Bicester in Oxfordshire. It is owned by Bicester Town Council and managed by Cherwell District Council.

The River Bure runs through the park and supplies water to a pond which has great crested newts. Habitats include grassland, scrub, broadleaved woodland and hedges.

References

Local nature reserves in Oxfordshire